Hartfield is a civil parish in Sussex, England. U.K.

Hartfield may also refer to:

Places
Hartfield, New York, U.S.
Hartfield, New Brunswick, Canada
Hartfield, Virginia, U.S.

People
Charlie Hartfield (born 1971), English footballer
Diego Hartfield (born 1981), Argentine tennis player
Justin Hartfield, American entrepreneur
Michael Hartfield (born 1990), American long jumper
Ronne Hartfield (born Ronola Rone in 1936), American author and museum consultant

See also
Heartfield (surname)